Karosa C 744 is an articulated intercity bus produced by bus manufacturer Karosa from the Czech Republic, in the years of 1988 to 1992. In production was succeeded by Karosa C 943 in 1997.

Construction features 
Karosa C 744 is model of Karosa 700 series. C 744 is unified with intercity bus models such as C 734 and C 735. It is made of two rigid sections linked by a pivoting joint. Body is semi-self-supporting with frame and engine with manual gearbox in the rear part. Only third C axle is propulsed, meaning that this articulated bus has pusher configuration. Front axle is independent, middle and rear axles are solid. All axles mounted on air suspension. On the right side are three doors. Inside are used leatherette seats. Drivers cab is not separated from the rest of the vehicle. Buses has an open design of turntable.

Production and operation 
Prototype of Karosa C 744 was made in the year 1986. In the year 1988 started serial production, which continued until 1992.

Historical vehicles 
Private collector in Slovakia (1 bus)
Technical museum in Brno, Czech Republic (1 bus)

See also 

 Article about Karosa C 744 buses in Prague
  Article about Karosa C 744 in Bratislava

 List of buses

Articulated buses
Buses manufactured by Karosa
Buses of the Czech Republic